Soft reboot may refer to:

 A warm reboot, where a computer system restarts without the need to interrupt the power
 A reboot (fiction) in which a certain degree of continuity is retained